Gilbert Elliot-Murray-Kynynmound, 2nd Earl of Minto,  (16 November 178231 July 1859), styled as Viscount Melgund between 1813 and 1814, was a British diplomat and Whig politician.

Background and education
Minto was the eldest son of the Gilbert Elliot-Murray-Kynynmound, 1st Earl of Minto, and Anna Maria, daughter of Sir George Amyand, 1st Baronet. He was educated at Eton, St John's College, Cambridge and University of Edinburgh.

Diplomatic and political career
Minto was returned to Parliament for Ashburton in Devon in 1806, a seat he held until 1807, and then represented Roxburghshire between 1812 and 1814. He took a dim view of the Prince Regent and his government. The latter year he succeeded his father in the earldom and took his seat in the House of Lords. He was admitted to Privy Council in 1832.

From 1832 to 1834 he was Minister to Prussia. In 1835 he was appointed First Lord of the Admiralty under Lord Melbourne, a post he held until 1841, and later served as Lord Privy Seal under Lord John Russell from 1846 to 1852. In his youth, Elliot had gone to Corsica where his father was viceroy and he developed an abiding affection for Italy. He served as special envoy to Switzerland, Sardinia, Tuscany, Rome, Sicily in 1847–8. His influence in the Whig party was partly because his daughter, Lady Frances, was the wife of Lord John Russell.

Family
Lord Minto married Mary, daughter of Patrick Brydone, in 1806. They had at least five sons and five daughters. Lady Minto died in July 1853. Lord Minto survived her by six years and died in July 1859, aged 75. He was succeeded in the earldom by his eldest son, William.
 
Lady Charlotte (died 1899), married the Conservative MP Melville Portal.
Harriet Anne Gertrude (d. 9 Feb. 1855). Died young
William, 3rd Earl of Minto
Lady Mary Elizabeth married Ralph Abercromby, 2nd Baron Dunfermline. They had one daughter who married the brother of Coutts Trotter.
Hon. Sir Henry Elliot was a diplomat 
Sir Charles Elliot-Murray-Kynynmound was an Admiral of the Fleet. 
Frances Anna Maria (1815–1898) married John Russell, later Prime Minister.
Hon. George Francis (9 October 1822 – 14 February 1901), was a barrister. Died unmarried.
Lady Elizabeth Amelia Jane (c. 1823 – 18 Jan. 1892), who married Lt.-Col. Frederick Romilly, son of Samuel Romilly. They had issue.
Lt-Col. Hon. Gilbert (23 May 1826 – 25 May 1865), who married Katherine Anne Gilbert, daughter of Ashurst Gilbert, Archbishop of Chichester. They had no issue.

References

External links 
 

Minto, Gilbert Elliot-Murray-Kynynmound, 2nd Earl of
Minto, Gilbert Elliot-Murray-Kynynmound, 2nd Earl of
Minto, Gilbert Elliot-Murray-Kynynmound, 2nd Earl of
Minto, Gilbert Elliot-Murray-Kynynmound, 2nd Earl of
Minto, Gilbert Elliot-Murray-Kynynmound, 2nd Earl of
Minto, Gilbert Elliot-Murray-Kynynmound, 2nd Earl of
Members of the Parliament of the United Kingdom for Ashburton
Melgund, Gilbert Elliot-Murray-Kynynmound, Viscount
UK MPs 1806–1807
Melgund, Gilbert Elliot-Murray-Kynynmound, Viscount
Minto, Gilbert Elliot-Murray-Kynynmound, 2nd Earl of
Fellows of the Royal Society
Fellows of the Royal Society of Edinburgh
People educated at Eton College
Alumni of St John's College, Cambridge
Alumni of the University of Edinburgh
Members of the Privy Council of the United Kingdom